Odontopleurida is an order of very spinose trilobites closely related to the trilobites of the order Lichida.  Some experts group the Odontopleurid families, Odontopleuridae and Damesellidae, within Lichida.  Odontopleurids tend to have convex, bar-shaped cephalons, and lobed, knob-shaped glabella that extend to, or almost to the anterior margin.  Many, if not almost all odontopleurids have long spines that are derived either from the margins of the exoskeleton, or from granular or tubercular ornamentation, or both.  Many odontopleurids are so spinose so as to be described as having "spines on (their) spines."  Odontopleurids have 8 to 13 thoracic segments, with Odontopleuridae odontopleurids having no more than 10, and Damesellidae odontopleurids having no more than 13.  The pygidium tends to be very small, and invariably has long spines emanating from it in all known genera.

Genera of Damesellidae are restricted to Middle to Upper Cambrian marine strata, and may represent a transition between Cambrian-aged lichids, and odontopleurids of Odontopleuridae.  The odontopleurids of Odontopleuridae first appear in the Upper Cambrian, and go extinct before the end of the Frasnian stage of the late Devonian.

Odontopleuridae
Acanthalomina
?Acidaspidella
?Acidaspides
Acidaspis
Anacaenaspis
Apianurus
Archaeopleura
Boedaspis
Borkopleura
Brutonaspis
Calipernurus
Ceratocara
Ceratocephala
Ceratocephalinus
Ceratonurus
Chlustinia
Dalaspis
Diacanthaspis
Dicranurus
Dudleyaspis
Edgecombeaspis
Eoleonaspis
Exallaspis
Gaotania
Globulaspis
Hispaniaspis
Isoprusia
Ivanopleura
Kettneraspis
Koneprusia
Laethoprusia
Leonaspis
Meadowtownella
Miraspis
Ningnanaspis
Odontopleura
Orphanaspis
Periallaspis
Primaspis
Proceratocephala
Radiaspis
Rinconaspis
Selenopeltis
Selenopeltoides
Sinespinaspis
Stelckaspis
Taemasaspis
Uriarra
Whittingtonia
Damesellidae
?Adelogonus
Bergeronites
Blackwelderia
Blackwelderioides
Chiawangella
Cyrtoprora
Damesella
Damesops
Dipentaspis
Dipyrgotes
Neodrepanura
Duamsannella
Fengduia
Guancenshania
?Hercantyx
Histiomona
Jiawangaspis
Karslanus 
Liuheaspis
Metashantungia
Neodamesella
Palaeadotes,
Paradamesella
Parashantungia
Pingquania
Pionaspis
Protaitzehoia
Pseudoblackwelderia
Shantungia
Stephanocare
Taihangshania
Taitzehoia
Teinistion
Xintaia
Yanshanopyge

References

 
Trilobite orders
Miaolingian first appearances
Frasnian extinctions